Laraʼ (also called Luru, Berkati, Bakati, Bekatiq, Bekatiʼ Nyam-Pelayo, Bekatiʼ Kendayan, and Rara Bakatiʼ) is a language spoken by some 19,000 people in Borneo, on both the Indonesian side (West Kalimantan) and Malaysian side (Sarawak) of the island. Most information about it has been gathered by various Christian missionary groups.

References

Land Dayak languages